Shergarh is a village located in the Jodhpur District of Rajasthan state in western India. It is a panchayat village as well as being the tehsil headquarters for Shergarh tehsil.

History
Before Sher Shah Suri's conquest, the town was known as Kōśavardhana. Hinduism, Buddhism, and Jainism thrived co-existentially in the area, as is evident from the various inscriptions dating back to at least the 8th century A.D. Accordingly to one epigraph, there flourished a great religious establishment of the Jains side by side with a Buddhist monastery and a Shaivite shrine.

The Afghan emperor Sher Shah Suri is accused by `Abd al-Qadir Bada'uni and other Muslim historians for destroying old cities and in return founding new ones on their ruins after his own name. The medieval town is now mostly abandoned and its fort ruined. The old temple dedicated to Lakshmi Narayan was presumably built in 11th century AD and is still in existence.

Demographics
In the India census of 2001, Shergarh had a population of 6,054. Males constituted 3,160 of the population and females 2,894, for a gender ratio of 916 females per thousand males.

References

Villages in Jodhpur district